The Capitolium Vetus (Latin for ‘old Capitol’ or ‘ancient Capitol’) was an archaic temple in ancient Rome, dedicated to the Capitoline Triad.  distinguishes it from the main temple to the Triad on the Capitol and shows that it was the older of the two and possibly the oldest temple in Rome dedicated to them. It was on a site in what is now the Trevi district, to the north of the Quirinal and to the north-west of the Ministry of Defence. Its dedicatory inscriptions were found near the ministry.

See also
List of Ancient Roman temples

References

Bibliography
Samuel Ball Platner and Thomas Ashby, A topographical dictionary of Ancient Rome, Oxford University Press, 1929

Rome R. II Trevi
Temples in Rome
Temples of Jupiter
Temples of Juno
Temples of Minerva
Destroyed temples
Capitoline Triad